The Downsview Complex is a provincial office site located in the Downsview neighbourhood of Toronto, Ontario, Canada.

History
First developed in the 1950s during the construction of Ontario Highway 401 and residential neighbourhood from former farmland, the site is currently the location of the Ministry of Transportation's Toronto office (and part of the overall HQ staff) and the Ontario Provincial Police's Downsview detachment. Provincial driving test also takes place there.

Re-development

In 2010, re-development of the site began, in a plan expected to be implemented over a 20-year span.

First to be built was the new location for the province's Ontario Centre of Forensic Sciences and Coroner's office (re-located from downtown Toronto) on Wilson Avenue and Morton Shulman Avenue.

Construction also began on a new Humber River Regional Hospital, which would replace two nearby hospitals (Church and Keele). The hospital was scheduled to open in October 2015.

Other provincial offices will be built on the site. Many of the older Ministry of Transportation buildings located there will be demolished.

The OPP detachment will remain on the site.

New roads will be built to provide easier access:

 unnamed roadway from the entrance from Keele Street
 two named roadways from Wilson Avenue:
Morton Shulman Avenue - named for former Toronto coroner and politician Morton Shulman (formerly Agate Road)
Julian Road

References

Modernist architecture in Canada
Buildings and structures in Toronto
Ontario government buildings